Anum is an  Guan community in Asuogyaman District of the Eastern Region of Ghana, across from the Volta Lake.

Location
Anum lies about a kilometre east of the Volta Lake. The nearest town to the north is Boso, Ghana, also in the Eastern Region. Further north across the border into the Volta Region lies Kpalime Duga in the South Dayi District. Peki Dzake and Peki Wudome are to the east in the Volta Region. To the south is Asikuma, also in the Asuogyaman District. The district capital, Atimpoku is about 28 kilometres south of Anum.

References

Populated places in the Eastern Region (Ghana)